Ashton Higgins is an American professional stock car racing driver. He competes part-time in the ARCA Menards Series East, driving the No. 49 Toyota Camry for his own team ALH Motorsports.

Racing career

ARCA Menards Series East 
Higgins made his ARCA Menards Series East debut in 2022. On the Race to Stop Suicide 200 at New Smyrna Speedway entry list, it was revealed that he would make his debut in a No. 49 car owned by himself, but he withdrew. Instead, he and his team debuted at the Pensacola 200 at Five Flags Speedway, finishing with a strong 7th place. Higgins and the No. 49 car also withdrew from the race at Nashville. Higgins and the No. 49 car would attempt the season-finale at Bristol.

Motorsports career results

ARCA Menards Series

ARCA Menards Series East

References

External links 

Living people
ARCA Menards Series drivers
NASCAR drivers
Racing drivers from North Carolina
2002 births